Chomchadila (also, Choam-cha-di-la-poma) is a former Pomo settlement in Mendocino County, California. It was located southwest of Calpella, and Calpella was named after a chief of Chomdadila. Its precise location is unknown.

References

Former settlements in Mendocino County, California
Former populated places in California
Lost Native American populated places in the United States
Pomo villages